Enrique Romero (born 30 December 1963) is a Spanish former breaststroke swimmer who competed in the 1984 Summer Olympics.

References

1963 births
Living people
Spanish male breaststroke swimmers
Olympic swimmers of Spain
Swimmers at the 1984 Summer Olympics
Mediterranean Games gold medalists for Spain
Mediterranean Games medalists in swimming
Swimmers at the 1983 Mediterranean Games